Ray H. Altman (born 1943) is an American politician. He served as a Republican member for the 51st district of the Kentucky House of Representatives.

Altman attended Campbellsville University. In 1987 he was elected to the 51st district of the Kentucky House of Representatives, serving until 1996.

References 

1943 births
Living people
Place of birth missing (living people)
Republican Party members of the Kentucky House of Representatives
20th-century American politicians
21st-century American politicians
Campbellsville University alumni